Feeney Peak is a peak,  high, near the center of the Medina Peaks in Antarctica, standing  north of Patterson Peak on the east side of Goodale Glacier. It was mapped by the United States Geological Survey from ground surveys and U.S. Navy air photos, 1960–64, and was named by the Advisory Committee on Antarctic Names for Robert E. Feeney, a biologist at McMurdo Station for several summers, 1964–65 to 1968–69.

References 

Mountains of the Ross Dependency
Amundsen Coast